John Henry Whyte (30 April 1928 in Penang, Malaya – 16 May 1990 in New York, United States) was an Irish historian, political scientist and author of books on Northern Ireland, divided societies and church-state affairs in Ireland.

Early life
Whyte was born in 1928 in Penang, Malaya.  His father was manager of a rubber plantation on the mainland. Whyte's family left Malaya, and returned to Europe when he was three, eventually settling in Rostrevor, County Down, Northern Ireland. The Whytes are a well known County Down family recorded in the area since at least 1713. The Whyte family is said to have come to Ireland from South Wales with Strongbow in 1170 and settled in Leinster. Whyte was educated locally, at Ampleforth and Oriel College Oxford, from which he took a degree in Modern History in 1949. Having continued studies some two years later he was awarded a B.Litt degree for further research, which was to form the nebula of his first book which was to be published in 1958.

Whyte undertook National Service during the 1950s and worked as a history teacher in his old school before being appointed lecturer in Modern History at Makerere University, Uganda. In 1962 he returned to Ireland having been appointed first 'lecturer in empirical politics' at the then expanding University College Dublin (UCD). In 1966, he wed fellow academic Dr. Jean Murray and moved to Queen's University Belfast to undertake further studies.

Dispute with Roman Catholic Church and move to Belfast
In his book, Preventing the Future: Why Was Ireland So Poor for So Long?, Whyte's successor as Professor of Politics at UCD Tom Garvin gives an account as to the clerical politics prevalent at the time in UCD which caused Whyte's untimely departure:

At Queen's Whyte was to spend seventeen years as lecturer and reader, and from 1982 Professor of Irish Politics during which he sought to bring together political scientists from across the Island and develop an All-Ireland political science fellowship. From 1973 to 1974 he worked at as a research fellow at Harvard's Centre for International Affairs, and in 1975 he helped lead a team of researchers investigating the Northern Ireland conflict, then at its height. He also worked as research fellow at the Netherlands Institute for Advanced Studies during the late 1970s and was elected Member of the Royal Irish Academy in 1977, serving as Vice-President from 1989 to 1990.

Later career
In 1984 he returned to University College Dublin, then faced with stringent fiscal cuts and wider problems in Irish third-level education. In his second period at UCD, Whyte led the Department, which he now headed, through a troubled period of financial cuts while supervising a reorganisation of the undergraduate curriculum. In his last years at UCD he completed his seminal work, the widely regarded Interpreting Northern Ireland. Whyte finished correcting the proofs and compiling the index of this work only a week before his death. He died whilst on his way to the United States for an academic conference in 1990.

The John Whyte Trust Fund
Following his death Whyte's family, friends, and colleagues set up the John Whyte Trust Fund to continue Whyte's work, honour his memory and encourage "informed dialogue and interaction at graduate level among people who are likely to be leaders and opinion-shapers". To date the fund has awarded one fully paid scholarship and a number of part-paid scholarships as well as essay prizes annually. The fund also hosts an annual John Whyte Memorial Lecture. Speakers have included Paul Bew and Brendan O'Leary.

Trustees
The Trust Fund's trustees are as follows:
Professor Attracta Ingram, University College Dublin
Professor Shane O’Neill, Queen's University Belfast
Barbara Sweetman FitzGerald
Professor John Coakley, University College Dublin
Paul McErlean, MCE Public Relations, Belfast
Justice Catherine McGuinness, Dublin
Dr. Jean Whyte
Dr. William Whyte

Selected works
The Independent Irish Party 1850-9 (1958)
Church and State in Modern Ireland (1971)
Catholics in Western Democracies (1981)
Interpreting Northern Ireland (1990) - won the Christopher Ewart-Biggs Memorial Prize

Notes

External links
John Henry Whyte Trust Fund Website
Irish Revenue Commissioners' Document acknowledging the trusts charitable exemption
TCD's Listing of Scholarships of Limited Application

People educated at Ampleforth College
Alumni of Oriel College, Oxford
Harvard University staff
Academics of Queen's University Belfast
20th-century Irish historians
Irish political scientists
Christopher Ewart-Biggs Memorial Prize recipients
1928 births
1990 deaths
British expatriates in Malaysia
British expatriates in Uganda
20th-century political scientists